Gloria Burford Cabe (born September 15, 1941) was an American politician and political advisor. After serving a number of terms in the Arkansas House of Representatives, she managed the successful 1990 gubernatorial campaign of Bill Clinton and later served as his chief of staff.

Early life
Cabe was born in Pine Bluff, Arkansas and attended Hendrix College where she earned a BA in French in 1963. Her husband Robert Cabe, later a prominent attorney, also graduated from Hendrix.

Career
After working a few years as a teacher and librarian, in 1967 Cabe was named to the Arkansas Constitutional Revision Study Commission. She was a member of the Arkansas legislature from 1979-1980 and served a second term from 1983-1990.

Cabe later served as Counselor to the Chairman of the United States Export-Import Bank under Bill Clinton and George W. Bush. She was also senior advisor to Secretary Hillary Clinton in the United States Department of State Global Partnership Initiative.

References

External links
Gloria Cabe at the Encyclopedia of Arkansas

1941 births
Living people
20th-century American politicians
20th-century American women politicians
Democratic Party members of the Arkansas House of Representatives
Hendrix College alumni
Politicians from Pine Bluff, Arkansas
21st-century American women